João Maria Lemos Van Zeller  (born 29 March 1990) is a Portuguese footballer who plays for Leça as a forward.

Football career
On 2 March 2014, Van Zeller made his professional debut with Leixões in a 2013–14 Segunda Liga match against Portimonense.

References

External links

Stats and profile at LPFP 

1990 births
Living people
Portuguese footballers
Association football forwards
Liga Portugal 2 players
Leixões S.C. players